Olé is the ninth studio album by Spanish duo Azúcar Moreno, released on Sony International in 1998.

After the commercial success of the 1996 album Esclava De Tu Piel which had produced five hit singles followed by "Muévete Salvaje" from the 1997 hits compilation Mucho Azúcar - Grandes Éxitos, Azúcar Moreno teamed up with producer Ricardo "Eddy" Martinez in Miami again for the recording of 1998 album Olé. The album included further original material from Spanish singer Miguel Gallardo and Luis Cabañas, the team that had composed most of the singles on the preceding Esclava De Tu Piel, collaborations between Gallardo and David Ferrero and Pedro del Moral, songs by producer Richardo "Eddy" Martinez and it also saw one of the Salazar sisters, Encarna, making her debut as composer on the track "Dime Que Me Quieres". Production-wise Olé followed the winning combination of up-to-date club beats fused with flamenco and rock and contrasting R&B influenced ballads and rumbas, arrangement-wise the album differed slightly to its predecessor as it featured live strings on several titles. The album also closes with the acoustic "No Pretenderás", with instrumentation of just flamenco guitars and palmas - and a guest appearance by the duo's brothers Los Chunguitos.

The lead single was the title track "Olé", just like "Sólo Se Vive Una Vez" musically influenced by contemporary dance genres like reggaeton and dancehall but, as the title suggests, lyrically a tribute to the duo's native Spain.  "Olé" was also released as two separate remix singles, the second entitled Olé - The Summer '99 Remixes featuring the track remixed and with additional production by renowned Latin remixer, DJ, music producer and arranger Pablo Flores, best known for being Gloria Estefan's personal remixer but also for having co-produced major hits for among others Madonna, Chayanne, Shakira and Ricky Martin. Flores' Club Mix of "Olé" was substantially rearranged from the original, not just by speeding up the tempo for the dancefloor but by adding new orchestration of brass, flamenco guitars and castanets to emphasize the song's lyrics and the track proved to be another big hit single for Azúcar Moreno in both Spain and Latin America.

The second single released and second big hit was "¡Mecachis!" ("Mechachis en la mar" a mildly profane expression, roughly translated as "Damnit!"), a midtempo dance track again written by Miguel Gallardo and Luis Cabañas and also issued with a series of dance remixes on the ¡Mechachis! - The Alabim-Bom-Ba-Remixes release, mixed by co-producers Pedro del Moral and David Ferrero.

Further hit singles from the album include the double A-side "Ese Beso"/"No Pretenderás".

While Olé didn't manage to match the extraordinary sales figures of the preceding Esclava De Tu Piel - half a million in Spain alone - it did sell some two-hundred thousand copies and was later awarded double platinum in Spain.

Track listing

"Olé" (Pedro del Moral, David Ferrero, Miguel Gallardo) - 4:22
"¡Mecachis!" (Luis Cabañas, Miguel Gallardo) - 3:12  
"Ande Yo Caliente" (Luis Cabañas, Miguel Gallardo) - 4:02  
"Suave" (Yumitus) - 4:09  
"Flamenco" (Pedro Rilo, César Valle) - 4:19  
"Comeme la Piel a Besos" (F. Amat, Miguel Gallardo) - 3:42  
"Dime Que Me Quieres" (Encarna Salazar, Cristo Jesús Montes Suárez) - 3:31
"Ese Beso" (Mercy Martinez, Ricardo "Eddy" Martinez) - 4:02  
"Agua Que No Has De Beber" (David Ferrero, Miguel Gallardo, Pedro del Moral) - 4:39  
"Cumbayá" (Luis Cabañas, Miguel Gallardo) - 3:53  
"Apaga y Vamonos" (Mercy Martinez, Ricardo "Eddy" Martinez) - 3:20  
"No Pretenderás" (Juan Salazar) - 2:21

Personnel
 Azúcar Moreno - vocals 
 Geannie Cruz - background vocals  
George Noriega - background vocals
 Wendy Pedersen - background vocals    
 Rita Quintero - background vocals
Raul Midón - background vocals
 Ramiro Teran - background vocals
 Ramón Huerta - programming  
 Lee Levin - drums, percussion, programming
 Luis Cabañas - programming  
 Eddie Montilla - programming  
 Ricardo "Eddy" Martinez - programming
 Fernando Villar - programming 
 Pedro del Moral - programming 
 Elio DePalma - programming
 David Ferrero - programming   
 Luis Enrique - percussion  
 Julio Hernandez - bass guitar
José Antonio Rodríguez - guitar
 Rene Toledo - guitar   
 Angel Montejano - flamenco guitar
 Juan Antonio Salazar - flamenco guitar
 Jim Hacker - trumpet  
 Arturo Sandoval - trumpet
 Tony Concepcion - trumpet   
 Dana Teboe - trombone
Ed Calle - baritone sax, soprano sax, tenor sax
 Miami Symphonic Services - strings
 Huifang Chen - violin 
 Gustavo Correa - violin 
 John DiPuccio - violin  
 Rafael Elvira - violin 
Alfredo Oliva - violin
 Laszio Pap - violin  
 Joan Faigen - violin
 Lionel Segal - violin  
 Coral Tafoya - violin
 Mariusz Wojtowica - violin  
 Yang Xi - viola  
 Debbie Spring - viola       
 David Chappell - viola 
 Tim Barnes - viola    
 David Cole - cello
 Chris Glansdorp - cello 
 Claudio Jaffe - cello 
 Robert Moore - cello

Production
 Ricardo "Eddy" Martinez - record producer, musical arranger, musical director, orchestration
 José Luis de Carlos - executive producer 
José Antonio Rodríguez - musical arranger
 Juan Antonio Salazar - musical arranger
 Tony "Dr. Edit" Garcia - musical arranger 
 Eddie Montilla - musical arranger
 Ramón Huerta - musical arranger
 Mike Couzzi - engineer, mixing  
 Luis Carlos Esteban - engineer  
 Jorge Ramirez - engineer  
Eric Schilling - engineer
 Sandra Vicente - engineer 
 Jose Vinader - engineer 
 Boris - engineer
 Kieran Wagner - assistant engineer
 Scott Kieklak - assistant engineer
 Mike Fuller - mastering       
 Juanjo Manez - stylist  
 Carlos Martin - graphic design

Certifications

Sources and external links
 [ Allmusic discography]
 Discogs.com discography
 Rateyourmusic.com discography

References

1998 albums
Azúcar Moreno albums